Batuhan is a masculine Turkish given name. The name is derived from the Turkic name Batu/Batur, which means brave/strong and Han which is a Turkic title for ruler.

References 

Turkish masculine given names